The Film Archive Forum represents all of the public sector film and television archives which care for the UK's moving image heritage. It represents the UK's public sector moving image archives in all archival aspects of the moving image, and acts as the advisory body on national moving image archive policy.

History 

The Film Archive Forum was established in 1987 with the object of fostering an informal network of British moving image archives. Four archives sent representatives to the first meeting, but the Forum now contains eleven institutional members, representing all the national and regional public sector moving image archives of the UK. Full membership remains institutional, although others can be invited to attend Forum meetings as Observing Members. The Forum takes an interest in all the archival aspects of the moving image. It has particular interest in the preservation of nitrate film, acetate film, videotape and digital media; the training of archivists, acquisitions policy, standards for archives, copyright, co-operation with film laboratories, and contacts with foreign archives.

Members 

Current members of the Film Archive Forum are the BFI National Archive, the Scottish Screen Archive, the National Screen and Sound Archive of Wales, the Imperial War Museum Film and Video Archive, the East Anglian Film Archive, the Media Archive for Central England, the North West Film Archive, the Northern Region Film and Television Archive, Screen Archive South East, the South West Film and Television Archive, the Wessex Film and Sound Archive, and the Yorkshire Film Archive.

Observer Members 

The Film Archive Forum has eight observer members. They are the British Library, the British Universities Film & Video Council, the Irish Film Institute, London's Screen Archives: The Regional Network, the Museums, Libraries and Archives Council, the National Archives (UK), the National Council on Archives, and the Northern Ireland Film and Television Commission.

External links
 Film Archives UK (formerly Film Archive Forum)
 BFI National Archive
 Scottish Screen Archive
 National Screen and Sound Archive of Wales
 Imperial War Museum Film Archive
 East Anglian Film Archive
 Media Archive for Central England
 North West Film Archive
 Northern Region Film and Television Archive
 Screen Archive South East
 South West Film and Television Archive
 Wessex Film and Sound Archive
 Yorkshire Film Archive

Film archives in the United Kingdom